Sanballat was the name of several governors of Samaria during the Achaemenid and Hellenistic periods:

Sanballat the Horonite, or Sanballat I, governed in the mid- to late-5th century BCE; was a contemporary of Nehemiah
Sanballat II, grandson of the former, governed mid-4th century BCE
Sanballat III, governed around the time of Alexander the Great
Sanballat IV
Sanballat V